The 2022–23 TaiwanBeer HeroBears season was the franchise's 2nd season, its second season in the T1 League, its 2nd in Taipei City. The HeroBears are coached by Yang Chih-Hao in his second year as head coach.

Draft 

 Reference：

The HeroBears acquired 2022 and 2023 second-round draft picks from Taichung Wagor Suns in exchange for Chou Tzu-Hua. On August 25, 2022, the second rounder, Huang Jian-Zhi had joined Changhua BLL of the Super Basketball League. On September 14, the third rounder, Huang Hung-Yu had joined Taiwan Beer of the Super Basketball League.

Standings

Roster 

<noinclude>

Game log

2022 Interleague Play 
The Taiwan Beer players Liang Hao-Zhen and Feng Cheng-Kai joined to the TaiwanBeer HeroBears, and the TaiwanBeer HeroBears players Chien Chao-Yi and Lu Tsai Yu-Lun joined to the Taiwan Beer in these invitational games. On September 7, 2022, TaiwanBeer HeroBears announced that Shang Wei-Fang joined to the team as the player in these invitational games. And Liang Hao-Zhen didn't appear to the player list.

Group match

Quarterfinals

Semifinals

Finals

Preseason

Regular season

Player Statistics 
<noinclude>

Regular season

 Reference：

Transactions

From Taiwan Beer

Move to Taiwan Beer

Out on loan

Free agents

Additions

Subtractions

Awards

References 

2022–23 T1 League season by team
TaiwanBeer HeroBears seasons